Proteus is a genus of Gram-negative bacteria. Proteus bacilli are widely distributed in nature as saprophytes, being found in decomposing animal matter, sewage, manure soil, the mammalian intestine, and human and animal feces. They are opportunistic pathogens, commonly responsible for urinary and septic infections, often nosocomial.

The term Proteus signifies changeability of form, as personified in the Homeric poems in Proteus, "the old man of the sea", who tends the sealflocks of Poseidon and has the gift of endless transformation.  The first use of the term “Proteus” in bacteriological nomenclature was made by Hauser (1885), who described under this term three types of organisms which he isolated from putrefied meat.

Clinical significance
Three species—P. vulgaris, P. mirabilis, and P. penneri—are opportunistic human pathogens. Proteus includes pathogens responsible for many human urinary tract infections. P. mirabilis causes wound and urinary tract infections. Most strains of P. mirabilis are sensitive to ampicillin and cephalosporins. P. vulgaris is not sensitive to these antibiotics but ticarcillin. However, this organism is isolated less often in the laboratory and usually only targets immunosuppressed individuals. P. vulgaris occurs naturally in the intestines of humans and a wide variety of animals, and in manure, soil, and polluted waters. P. mirabilis, once attached to the urinary tract, infects the kidney more commonly than E. coli. P. mirabilis is often found as a free-living organism in soil and water.

About 10–15% of kidney stones are struvite stones, caused by alkalinization of the urine by the action of the urease enzyme (which splits urea into ammonia and carbon dioxide) of Proteus (and other) bacterial species.

Identification

Proteus species do not usually ferment lactose, but have shown to be capable glucose fermenters depending on the species in a triple sugar iron (TSI) test. Since it belongs to the order Enterobacterales, general characters are applied on this genus. It is oxidase-negative but catalase- and nitrate-positive. Specific tests include positive urease (which is the fundamental test to differentiate Proteus from Salmonella) and phenylalanine deaminase tests.

On the species level, indole is considered reliable, as it is positive for P. vulgaris, but negative for P. mirabilis. Most strains produce a powerful urease enzyme, which rapidly hydrolyzes urea to ammonia and carbon monoxide; exceptions are some Providencia strains. Species can be motile, and have characteristic "swarming" patterns. Underlying these behaviors are the somatic O and flagellar H antigens, so named based on Kauffman–White classification. This system is based on historic observations of Edmund Weil (1879–1922) and Arthur Felix (1887–1956) of a thin surface film produced by agar-grown flagellated Proteus strains, a film that resembled the mist produced by breath on a glass. Flagellated (swarming, motile) variants were therefore designated H forms (German Hauch, for film, literally breath or mist); nonflagellated (nonswarming, nonmotile) variants growing as isolated colonies and lacking the surface film were designated as O forms (German ohne Hauch, without film [i.e., without surface film of mist droplets]).

The cell wall O-antigen of certain strains of Proteus, such as OX-2, OX-19, OX-k, crossreact with several species of Rickettsia. These antigens can be used in laboratory to detect the presence of antibodies against certain Rickettsia species in patients' sera. This test is called Weil-Felix reaction after its originators.

See also
 Dienes phenomenon

References

Bacteria genera